Golić is a Bosnian, Serbian and Croatian surname. Notable people with the name include:

Andrej Golic (born 1974), Bosnian-French handball player
Biljana Golić (born 1977), Serbian tennis player
Bob Golic (1931–2013), Canadian football player
Bob Golic (born 1957), American football player
Jovan Golić (born 1986), Bosnian footballer
Mike Golic (born 1962), American football player and television host
Mike Golic Jr. (born 1989), American football player and television host
Nebojša Golić (born 1977), Bosnian-Serbian handball player
Slađana Golić (born 1960), Bosnian basketball player
Srebrenka Golić (born 1958), Bosnian politician

Bosnian surnames
Croatian surnames
Serbian surnames
Slovene-language surnames